Colosse was a  74-gun ship of the line of the French Navy. Between 1815 and 1827, her forecastle and quarterdeck were razéed and she was turned into the flush deck, 60-gun first rank frigate Pallas.

Career 
Colosse was ordered on 20 February 1812. She was launched on 5 December 1813, amidst a ceremony honouring the anniversary of the Battle of Austerlitz, and commissioned in January 1814 under Captain Louvel.

In 1821, she cruised in the Caribbean under Captain Ducampe de Rosamel. During the events of the "Hundred Thousand Sons of Saint Louis", she took part in the bombardment of Cadiz under Captain de la Bretonnière.

Between 1815 and 1827, her forecastle and quarterdeck were razéed, and she was turned into a 60-gun first rank frigate, with two complete batteries, and renamed Pallas.

As Pallas, she took part in the Invasion of Algiers in 1830, and in the Battle of the Tagus, under Captain Buchet de Châteauville.
Upon her return, she was decommissioned, and condemned in 1840.

References

External links 

 
 

Ships of the line of the French Navy
Téméraire-class ships of the line
1813 ships